William Harry Laxton (born January 5, 1948) is a former Major League Baseball pitcher. Laxton pitched in all or part of five seasons in the majors between 1970 and 1977.

Early career 
Laxton grew up in Audubon, New Jersey and attended Audubon High School, graduating in 1966.

He was originally drafted by the Pittsburgh Pirates in the 7th round of the 1966 Major League Baseball Draft. He was traded to the Philadelphia Phillies in December 1967 along with Harold Clem, Woodie Fryman, and Don Money in exchange for future-Hall of Famer Jim Bunning. He made his major league debut for the Phillies on September 15, 1970, when he pitched an inning in relief against the Pittsburgh Pirates, ending the season with a total of two relief appearances. He was selected by the San Diego Padres in the rule 5 draft the next offseason, then pitched in parts of two seasons for them before being released, finishing with an 0–2 record in 18 relief appearances in the 1971 season and an 0–1 record in 1974 in 30 appearances, all but one in relief. He signed with the New York Mets, who subsequently traded him to the Detroit Tigers along with Rusty Staub in exchange for Mickey Lolich and Billy Baldwin on December 12, 1975. He pitched in 26 games for the Tigers in the 1976 season, three of them as a starter, ending the season with an 0–5 record.

Expansion 
In 1976, Laxton was drafted from the Tigers by the Seattle Mariners in the expansion draft. On April 8, 1977, Laxton earned his first career win as the winning pitcher in the Mariners' first ever win. Laxton pitched the top of the ninth, and the Mariners scored two in the bottom of the inning for a come-from-behind, 7–6 win over the California Angels.

Career's end 
Before season's end, Laxton had been traded to the Cleveland Indians, and after the 1977 season would never pitch in the majors again. He started the 1978 season in the minor leagues with the Portland Beavers. The Indians traded him in midseason, sending him back to the Padres for Dave Freisleben. He finished the year with the Hawaii Islanders, then retired.

Laxton's son, Brett, pitched in the major leagues in 1999–2000 for the Oakland Athletics and Kansas City Royals.

References

External links

1948 births
Living people
Alexandria Aces players
Audubon High School (New Jersey) alumni
Baseball players from Camden, New Jersey
Cleveland Indians players
Clinton Pilots players
Detroit Tigers players
Eugene Emeralds players
Florida Instructional League Phillies players
Florida Instructional League Pirates players
Hawaii Islanders players
Major League Baseball pitchers
People from Audubon, New Jersey
Philadelphia Phillies players
Portland Beavers players
Reading Phillies players
Salem Rebels players
San Diego Padres players
Seattle Mariners players
Tidewater Tides players
Tigres de Aragua players
American expatriate baseball players in Venezuela